The 2007 Coupe de France Final was a football match held at Stade de France, Saint-Denis on 12 May 2007, that saw FC Sochaux-Montbéliard defeat Olympique de Marseille in a penalty shoot-out. After normal time and extra time could not separate the two sides, the match was to be decided on penalty kicks. Toifilou Maoulida and Ronald Zubar miss for Olympique de Marseille, whereas only FC Sochaux-Montbéliard's captain, Jérémie Bréchet missed for the winning team.

Match details

Gallery

Trivia
Notice that 6 of the 14 players from Sochaux-Montbéliard who have played and won this final, were in transferred in other clubs the next season.
 Both Djibril Cissé, scorer of Marseille's two goals and Anthony Le Tallec, scorer of Sochaux' second were on loan to the clubs from Liverpool F.C.

See also
2006–07 Coupe de France

External links
Match report
Coupe de France results at Rec.Sport.Soccer Statistics Foundation

Coupe De France Final
2007
Coupe De France Final 2007
Coupe De France Final 2007
Coupe De France Final 2007
Coupe de France Final
Sport in Saint-Denis, Seine-Saint-Denis
Coupe de France Final